The Theban Tomb TT40 is located in  Qurnet Murai, part of the Theban Necropolis, on the west bank of the Nile, opposite to Luxor. It is the burial place of the ancient Egyptian Viceroy of Kush named Amenhotep called Huy, who lived during the end of the 18th Dynasty during the reign of Tutankhamun.

Huy was the son of a lady named Werner. His father is not known. Huy was married to Taemwadjsy, chief of the harem of Amun and of the Harem of Nebkheperure (Tutankhamun). They had a son named Paser.

Tomb
In the tomb there is reference to a Temple named "Satisfying the Gods" in Nubia. Huy is shown being greeted there by Khay, High Priest of Nebkehperure (Tutankhamen), Penne, Deputy of the fortress of Nebkheperure (Tutankhamen), Huy, the Mayor, and  Mermose, (his brother) the second prophet of Nebkheperure. Taemwadjsy was Chief of the Harem of Nebkheperure (Chief of the female attendants of the temple) at this temple. On one of the walls in the tomb chapel is depicted a Nubian delegation coming to Egypt. One of the officials named there is the chief of Miam Heqanefer, who is also known from his tomb in Nubia. Another official shown in the tomb and known from other sources is Paenniut.
A complete and detailed description of the tomb is given on Osirisnet (see External Links).

See also
 List of Theban tombs

References

External links
Thierry Benderitter. Osirisnet.

Buildings and structures completed in the 13th century BC
Theban tombs